"Rapture" (sometimes referenced as "Rapture (Tastes So Sweet)") is a song by American recording duo iiO. It was chosen as the lead single from their debut studio album, Poetica (2005). The song was written by both the members; Nadia Ali and Markus Moser, while production was handled just by Moser. The song was released in the United Kingdom on October 29, 2001, by Data Records and was released in the United States via Universal Records in January 2002.

With the song winning positive reviews from music critics, citing it as catchy and one of the best songs of the year, the song was a commercial success. The song charted inside the top 10 in several countries, including the United Kingdom, Australia, Canada, Ireland, New Zealand, and Romania. "Rapture" also reached the top 50 on the US Billboard Hot 100, peaking at number 46 in March 2002. A music video was also shot, showing the group in a futuristic city with visual lighting.

In 2010, the song was re-released by former iiO frontwoman Nadia Ali as a single from her remix compilation, Queen of Clubs Trilogy: the Best of Nadia Ali Remixed. This version was her most successful solo release, peaking at number three in Romania while also charting in several European countries.

Background and composition
At the time, 17-year-old Nadia Ali was working in the New York offices of Versace, when a co-worker introduced her to producer Markus Moser, who was looking for a female singer to collaborate on some of his productions for a girl group. The two teamed up and started a group that was originally named "Vaiio", named after the Sony VAIO laptop Ali used to write lyrics on. They later dropped the "va", on the advice of their label, to avoid causing problems in the future with Sony. Working with Moser, she wrote the lyrics and the vocals for the songs.

According to John Bush at AllMusic, the song "is pure pop, in a dance sense: a post-trance version of vocoder-ized disco, complete with modulating Moroder bassline, an evocative female vocal, and an unmissable hook repeated endlessly."

Critical reception
The song received favorable reviews from music critics. John Bush from AllMusic awarded the song two stars out of five, however. Steward Mason from the same publication highlighted the song as an album standout, saying "The gathered single sides, "Kiss You," "[Rapture]," "Smooth," and "At the End," are here in new and more pop-oriented mixes that show off not only Moser's knack for melody, but also the duo's key asset: singer [Nadia Ali]'s alluring purr of a voice."

StickyBoots from About.com said "'Rapture'... surely you've heard this track countless times, whether in the club, on the radio, or on your favorite mix compilation, and surely you have some specific memory that it conjures up."

Chart performance
Commercially, the song was a huge success worldwide. The song peaked inside the top 40 in countries including the Netherlands, Belgium, Sweden, Finland and Denmark. The song peaked inside the top 50 in the United States, peaking at 46 on the US Billboard Hot 100. The song also peaked at number two in the United Kingdom and the US Hot Dance Club Songs, as well as number four in Canada.

"Rapture" was successful in both Australia and New Zealand. The song debuted inside the top 20 of the Australian Singles Chart while debuting inside the top 40 of the New Zealand Singles Chart. The track eventually peaked within the top 10 in both countries, at numbers three and eight, respectively.

Music video
The video to "Rapture" was directed by Andy Hylton and features the duo throughout. The video takes place in a futuristic city where Nadia Ali is seen in a room full of machines that scan her, digitize her, and project a hologram of her high above the city, while Markus Moser is seen driving his car through the city.

The 2008 release of Rapture Reconstruction features a limited re-edited video as a multimedia bonus. It does not change the "storyline" of the clip, but includes many different angles and scenes to the original version.

Track listings

Charts and certifications

Weekly charts

Year-end charts

Certifications

Release history

Nadia Ali re-release

Nadia Ali re-released the song as a single from her remix compilation Queen of Clubs Trilogy. Released as the only single from the compilation, it was remixed by Avicii, Gareth Emery and Tristan Garner. Ali said she chose the three to remix the track because they were considered tastemakers in electronic dance music. She said she also chose to re-release the track because she wanted to introduce it to a new generation of music listeners who were not familiar with the original iiO version.

Music video
The music video for "Rapture" was shot in December 2010 in Sacramento, California and directed by Brando Neverland. The video premiered on January 24, 2011, on YouTube and was set to the Avicii Remix. The concept of the video portrays Ali's elevation as the "Queen of Clubs".

Track listing

Charts

Weekly charts

Year-end charts

Release history

Cover versions
 Hong Kong singer Sandy Lam covered the song in Cantonese under the title "Diva" on her album Encore in 2002.
 British girl group Bananarama released their own version of the song on their album Viva in 2009.
 British DJ Kryder released his version of the song in early 2021 with vocals from Natalie Shay.

Samples
The Raye song "Regardless" samples "Rapture", which resulted in an iiO writing credit.

See also
 List of number-one dance singles of 2001 (Australia)
 List of number-one dance singles of 2002 (Australia)

References

External links
 Rapture at Discogs

2001 debut singles
2001 songs
2002 singles
2010 singles
Data Records singles
Eurodance songs
IiO songs
Ministry of Sound singles
Nadia Ali (singer) songs
Songs written by Nadia Ali (singer)
Universal Records singles